Stillwater Area High School (SAHS) is a public school located in Oak Park Heights, Minnesota, United States. It serves as the primary high school for the Stillwater Area Public School District (834), the oldest public school district in Minnesota.

The current campus was built in 1993 thanks to a 28 million dollar bond that was approved by the citizens of District 834. The previous location is now Stillwater Middle School. (SMS). Students from both SMS and Oakland Middle School attend Stillwater Area High School.  Newsweek ranked the school #326 in their "List of the 500 Top High Schools in America in 2015."

Stillwater was designed by the architecture firm ATS&R. In 2017, the school completed a $97 million dollar renovation, involving the construction of a new 9th grade wing, a new gym and Pony Activity Center (PAC).

Athletics

The 2016 boys' soccer team finished the season ranked fourth in the nation by USA Today on its final Super 25 Expert Rankings.

Notable alumni
Thomas J. Abercrombie — photographer, first journalist to reach South Pole 
Glen Perkins — pitcher for Minnesota Twins 
Butch Thompson — jazz pianist and clarinetist
E.E. Knight — science fiction and fantasy writer 
Denis McDonough — White House Chief of Staff 2013-17 Current United States Secretary of Veterans Affairs.
Gordon Klatt — colorectal specialist, founder of Relay For Life
Jessie Diggins — Olympic cross-country skier
Patrick Hicks — novelist, poet, and essayist
Shura Baryshnikov, dancer/actress
Anne La Berge — flutist, composer
Ben Blankenship — Olympic distance runner
Rich Sommer — actor (Mad Men)
 Chris Maddock, stand-up comedian
 Zach Sobiech, singer/songwriter of "Clouds"
Chris Engler, former NBA player
Drew Gilbert, MLB outfielder for Houston Astros
Austin Murr, MLB outfielder for Detroit Tigers
Noah Cates, NHL winger for Philadelphia Flyers

Notable staff
Chris Engler — former NBA player, history teacher 
Phil Housley— former NHL player, former head coach of Stillwater hockey team

Controversies
In late 2005, Stillwater Area High School received national attention after student journalists from the School Newspaper The Pony Express uncovered Joshua Gardner, a registered sex offender posing as British royalty at the school. The journalists who helped uncover the true identity of Gardner were interviewed on Fox News, CNN, Good Morning America, MSNBC, and participated in a number of radio and newspaper interviews.

References

External links 
The Pony Express (school newspaper)

Public high schools in Minnesota
Educational institutions established in 1993
Schools in Washington County, Minnesota
1993 establishments in Minnesota